Athina-Thessaloniki (Athens to Thessaloniki) is a Greek television series, that was aired in season 1997-98 by ERT1. The series was written by Nikos Mouratidis and it starred Spyros Papadopoulos and Filareti Komninou. It stood out for its soundtrack composed by Evanthia Reboutsika and performed by Nana Mouskouri.

Plot
A musician and a philologist live in the two biggest Greek cities, Athens and Thessaloniki. They are both married, but when they fall in love between them, they collide with their families. Eventually, their relationship ends to a dead-end mostly because of the distance of their residence places.

Cast
Spyros Papadopoulos
Filareti Komninou
Katerina Didaskalou
Louiza Podimata

References

External links

Hellenic Broadcasting Corporation original programming
Greek drama television series
1997 Greek television series debuts
1998 Greek television series endings
1990s Greek television series